Jim Doherty (born 13 September 1958 in Kilmarnock), is a Scottish retired football midfielder.

Doherty began his career with hometown team Kilmarnock, before moving to Clyde in 1981. He enjoyed the best spell of his career at Shawfield, making over 200 appearances in all competitions for the club. He had spells with Queen of the South and Stranraer, before injury forced him to retire in 1990.

External links

Living people
1958 births
Kilmarnock F.C. players
Clyde F.C. players
Queen of the South F.C. players
Stranraer F.C. players
Scottish footballers
Association football midfielders
Scottish Football League players
Footballers from Kilmarnock